Carroll County is a county located in the U.S. state of Illinois. As of the 2010 census, the population was 15,387. Its county seat is Mount Carroll.

History
Carroll County was formed in 1839 out of Jo Daviess County. The county is named for Charles Carroll who signed the Declaration of Independence. Carroll, who died in 1832, was the last signer to die.

Geography
The Mississippi Palisades State Park is in this county, just north of the city of Savanna. The Savanna Army Depot is located partly in this county.

Adjacent counties
 Stephenson County - northeast
 Ogle County - east
 Whiteside County - south
 Clinton County, Iowa - southwest
 Jackson County, Iowa - west
 Jo Daviess County - northwest

National protected area
 Upper Mississippi River National Wildlife and Fish Refuge (part)

Major highways
  US Route 52
  Illinois Route 40
  Illinois Route 64
  Illinois Route 72
  Illinois Route 73
  Illinois Route 78
  Illinois Route 84

Climate and weather 

Demographics

As of the 2010 United States Census, there were 15,387 people, 6,622 households, and 4,343 families residing in the county. The racial makeup of the county was 96.9% white, 0.8% black or African American, 0.3% Asian, 0.3% American Indian, 0.6% from other races, and 1.1% from two or more races. Those of Hispanic or Latino origin made up 2.8% of the population. In terms of ancestry, 40.4% were German, 14.0% were Irish, 11.2% were English, and 10.6% were American.

Of the 6,622 households, 26.3% had children under the age of 18 living with them, 53.1% were married couples living together, 8.2% had a female householder with no husband present, 34.4% were non-families, and 29.8% of all households were made up of individuals. The average household size was 2.29 and the average family size was 2.80. The median age was 46.5 years.

The median income for a household in the county was $44,805 and the median income for a family was $55,341. Males had a median income of $42,421 versus $27,552 for females. The per capita income for the county was $25,914. About 7.8% of families and 11.7% of the population were below the poverty line, including 18.4% of those under age 18 and 5.8% of those age 65 or over.

Education
 Chadwick-Milledgeville Community Unit School District 399
 Eastland Community Unit School District 308
 West Carroll Community Unit School District 314

Communities

Cities
 Lanark
 Mt. Carroll
 Savanna

Villages
 Milledgeville
 Chadwick
 Shannon
 Thomson

Townships
Carroll County is divided into these twelve townships:

 Cherry Grove-Shannon
 Elkhorn Grove
 Fairhaven
 Freedom
 Mount Carroll
 Rock Creek-Lima
 Salem
 Savanna
 Washington
 Woodland
 Wysox
 York

Census designated place
 Lake Carroll

Unincorporated Communities
 Argo Fay
 Arnold
 Ashdale Junction
 Ayers
 Blackhawk
 Burke
 Center Hill
 Ebner
 Elkhorn Grove
 Fair Haven
 Georgetown
 Hazelhurst
 Hickory Grove
 Hitt
 Ideal
 Kittredge
 Marcus
 Polsgrove
 South Elkhorn
 Wacker
 Zier Cors

Notable people
 John Acker, Illinois state representative, was born on a farm near Savanna.
 Willis J. Bailey, United States Representative from Kansas and the 16th Governor of Kansas
 David J. Summerville, Wisconsin State Assemblyman

Politics

As a part of Yankee-settled Northern Illinois, Carroll County became solidly Republican upon that party's formation in the 1850s. Of all the counties won by inaugural Republican Party presidential nominee John Charles Frémont in 1856, Carroll County was to maintain the longest unbroken string of supporting the GOP in subsequent elections. It would give a plurality to every subsequent Republican Presidential nominee up to George W. Bush in 2004, beating by three elections the second longest run of Indiana's Porter County which was to give a plurality to Bill Clinton in 1996.

In that 1996 election Bob Dole won Carroll County by only 1.51 percentage points – the smallest margin by a Republican to that point – and in 2008 Illinois native Barack Obama broke this last remaining GOP streak stretching back to Frémont by carrying the county by 4.80 percentage points. Obama was to repeat his win in 2012 by 1.49 percent, but a dramatic swing to Republican Donald Trump in 2016 saw him win by the largest margin since Ronald Reagan’s 1984 landslide by gaining 59.6% of the vote in Carroll County, scoring slightly higher than George H.W. Bush's victory in 1988 in which Bush won 59.4% of the vote in Carroll County.

The largest margin of victory ever in Carroll County was achieved by Warren G. Harding who won 86.7% of votes in the county during the 1920 United States presidential election.

See also
 National Register of Historic Places listings in Carroll County, Illinois

References

External links
 Carroll County Government
 Visit Carroll County
 Village of Chadwick
 City of Lanark
 Village of Milledgeville
 City of Mt. Carroll
 City of Savanna
 Visit Savanna
 Village of Shannon
 Village of Thomson
 Visit Thomson
 United States Census Bureau 2007 TIGER/Line Shapefiles
 United States Board on Geographic Names (GNIS)
 United States National Atlas

 
Illinois counties
1839 establishments in Illinois
Populated places established in 1839
Illinois counties on the Mississippi River